Sunuwar, Sunuwar, or Kõinch (other spellings are Koinch and Koincha), is a Kiranti language spoken in Nepal and India by the Sunuwar people. It was first comprehensively attested by the Himalayan Languages Project. It is also known as Kõits Lo, Kiranti-Kõits, Mukhiya.

The Sunwar language is one of the smaller members of the Tibeto-Burman language family. About 40,000 speakers are residing in eastern Nepal.

Names 
The language is commonly known as Koic, for many ethnic Sunwar and Sunwar speakers also refer to the language as “Sunuwar, Kõinch , Koinch or Koincha (कोँइच); Kõits Lo (कोँइच लो), Kiranti-Kõits (किराँती-कोँइच) or Mukhiya (मुखिया).”

Moreover, most Sunwar speakers have the surname (सुनुवार), Sunuvār in Latin script. Many affiliated Sunwar with Sunar; they share the initial syllable, sun, “gold,” in Nepali, similar to the Sunar community of India, who are goldsmiths. However, the ethnonym Sunuvār is believed to be connected with Sunkosi, a river nearby the Sunwar villages.

Geographic distribution 

The Sunwar language is commonly spoken in a cluster of Sunwar villages, located around the region of the core spoken language. These villages are scattered alongside the river banks of Likhu Khola, in two bordering central-eastern districts of Nepal, distant from the main Nepalese road system: in the Okhaldhū۠ngā District (part of Province No. 1), around the village of Vacul; and in the Rāmechāp District (part of Bagmati Province), around the villages of Pahare and of Kũbhu Kãsthālī for a smaller group of Sunwar speakers. The majority of the Sunwar speakers live on the southern border area of this region, between the villages of Pahare and Vacul.

Located 1,800 meters above sea level, their fields aren’t all fallow from year round cultivation (Borchers, 2008). Therefore, many Sunwar households are farmers, own a small lot of land and livestock. Moreover, each village often visits their neighboring village markets to purchase inaccessible goods such as spices, sugar, tea, and salt. In the winter, they experience no snow but freezing temperatures. In warmer weather, they experience a lot of rainfall, in the summer, monsoon rainfall. Especially between June and August, it is when they experience the most rain, more so monsoon rainfall.

According to Borchers, there are other villages located outside of the core region. The Surel are claimed to be Sunwar speakers however there are no certainties that it is true.

Written language

Sunuwar (or Jenticha, Koĩts, Mukhiya) native alphabet in Sikkim, India 
Sunuwar speakers from Sikkim, northeastern India, use the Sunuwar alphabet (ISO 15924 script code: Sunu) for printed materials such as newspapers and literature. The alphabet, also known as Jenticha alphabet, Sunuwar Lipi, Koĩts Lipi or Mukhiya script, or जेँःतिच ब्रेःसे (jẽtica brese), was developed in 1942 by Karna Bahadur Sunuwar (1926-1991), and got official recognition in Sikkim and Eastern Nepal where it is taught in schools. The Sunuwar or Jenticha script, is unrelated to any other scripts (even if some letter shapes have some resemblance to Latin and Limbu letter forms with similar phonetic value), and behaves like an alphabet with 35 base letters, written left-to-right, with syllabic features, extended with combining diacritics. The script also features its own set of decimal digits.

Unlike other Indic scripts derived from Brahmic, the Sunuwar alphabet includes no combining vowel signs: the script was initially a pure alphabet and the base consonants initially did not have any inherent vowel. But a second version of the script modified the orthographic rules to imply its presence, where the inherent vowel would be altered when appending any independent vowel letters, or suppressed by using a virama (or halant) sign in some consonant clusters or for consonants in final position of syllables. The independent letter form for the inherent vowel is now removed in most cases from the normal orthography in the middle of words, only used in isolation (i.e. no longer written when following a leading consonant, unless it is at end of words). A number of glyphic forms (conjuncts using consonants in half forms) were added to the script after this orthographic change for more easily writing consonant clusters, instead of writing multiple consonants with virama signs.

Devanagari-based abugida for the Sunwar language in Nepal 
Although Sunwar has no traditional written language in Nepal, most literate speakers use the Devanagari abugida, also used for writing Nepali.

 Independent vowels and diphthongs

 Consonants with inherent vowel

 Combining diacritics
 The sign ्, known in Sunwar as sangmilu, represents a virama or halant; it is used to silent the inherent vowel after the consonant.
 The sign ँ, known in Sunwar as taslathenk, corresponds to the candrabindu in Devanagari; it is used to nasalize the vowel.

Tikamuli native abugida (since 2005) 
In 2005, another syllabic alphabet or abugida was developed for Sunuwar; it is known as Tikamuli.

Phonology 
Sunwar phonology is significantly influenced by the language of Nepali.

Consonants 
The Sunwar language has a mid-sized arrangement of thirty-two consonantal phonemes:

 Sound in parentheses only are heard in words borrowed from Nepali. Sounds in brackets are only heard as allophones.
 The implosive sound [] was heard phonemically until recently among dialects. It is now heard as a plosive [] in the village of Saipu, and as an approximant [] in the village of Kũbhu. It is only heard rarely in word-initial position among the speakers of Saipu.

Vowels 
According to Borchers, there are eleven vowel phonemes in Sunwar:

 [a~ɑ], /ā / [aː], /e/ [e~ɛ], /i/ [i], /o/ [o], /u/ [u], / ū/ [uː~y], /ã/ [ã~ɑ̃], /ã̄/ [ãː], /ẽ/ [ẽ~ɛ̃], /ĩ/ [ĩ]

 Vowels with bar - Represents long vowels
 Vowels with tilde -  Represents short nasalized vowels
 Vowels with bar and tilda - Represents long and nasalized vowels

Diphthongs 
There are a total of eight diphthongs in Sunwar: /ai/ [aɪ], /aĩ/ [aɪ̃], /au/ [au], /eu/ [eu], /oi/ [oi], /oĩ/ [oĩ], /ui/ [ui], /uĩ/ [uĩ]

According to Borchers, a principled way to distinguish diphthongs from a sequence of two monophthongs does not exist in the Sunwar language.

As exemplified by Borchers, this table consists of examples of contrasts between diphthongs:

Syllable structure 
Syllable Structure of Sunwar: C(C)V(V)(C)(C)

Morphology

Markers

Case-marking suffixes 
According to Borchers, “all case markers in the Sunwar language are suffixes.”

As exemplified by Borchers, this table consists of the noun case markers.

Dual marker 
A dual marker can be associated with dual/pair or the cardinal number ‘two’.

Example of dual marker by Borchers:

Plural marker 
In the Sunwar language, both nouns and pronouns can be marked as dual or plural.

In addition items in a group can be marked plural.

Examples of the plural marker used to point at items in a group by Borchers:

Absent marker 
According to Borchers, the Sunwar language does not have a zero morpheme, but it can still indicate the number amount of something through verbal agreement markers or numerals.

Example of the absent marker by Borchers:

Suffixes

Possessive suffix:  (Animate Agent) 
According to Borchers, the possessive suffix  is attached to a human or animate agent to indicate a possessive relationship.

Examples of the possessive  by Borchers:

Possessive suffix:  (inanimate subject) 
According to Borchers, inanimate subjects are marked with the possessive suffix  to indicate what it is "made of".
Example of possessive  indicating what it is "made of" by Borchers:

Quantifiers 
Quantifiers in the Sunwar language are loaned from Nepali. Quantifiers are used for amounts or masses.
As exemplified by Borchers, this table consists of quantifiers; including some that are loaned from Nepali.

Examples of quantifiers that indicate amounts or masses by Borchers:

Syntax

Adjectives:  
According to Borchers, adjectives can belong to the verbal noun form, with an attached . In the Sunwar language, some adjectives are borrowed from Nepali.

Adjectives: Color forms 
Borchers also notes that adjectives can belong to the form/term color.
As exemplified by Borchers, this table consists of the color form/terms.

Adjectives: Non-verbal nouns without  attached 
The Sunwar language has a category for adjectives under the form ‘others’, that are not verbal nouns. In addition, some adjectives may be interchangeable as an adverb.
As exemplified by Borchers, this table consists of the adjectives that are not verbal nouns ending in  form/terms.

Particles 
As exemplified by Borchers, this table consists of particles in correlation to various relationships.

Postpositional particles 
According to Borchers, the Sunwar language borrows particles from Nepali that indicate the relationship between clauses.
Examples of postpositional particles by Borchers:

My stomach v.s. your stomach 
Example by Borchers:

Order: Subject-object-verb 
Examples of order: Subject/Object/Verb by Borchers.

Vocabulary
Seu+wa+la (Sewala)

Language structure
In linguistic typology, a subject+object+verb (SOV) language is one in which the subject, object, and verb of a sentence always or usually appear in that order. If English were SOV, "Sam oranges ate" would be an ordinary sentence, as opposed to the actual Standard English "Sam ate oranges". (A Grammar of Sunwar)

Sunwar people called "Khangsa" sign language with voice and direct action, for foreign people who don't understand a sunuwar language.

Numerals (Devanagari)

References

External links
Sunwar language website

Languages of Nepal
Kiranti languages
Languages of Sikkim
Brahmic scripts
Languages of Koshi Province